Toivo Antero Wiherheimo (13 July 1898 in Helsinki – 5 March 1970 in Helsinki; surname until 1906 Grönhag) was a Finnish economist and politician. He served as Deputy Minister of Trade and Industry from 17 November 1953 to 4 May 1954 and again from 29 August 1958 to 13 January 1959, Minister of Defence from 29 August 1958 to 13 January 1959 and Minister of Trade and Industry from 13 April 1962 to 17 December 1963 and again from 12 September 1964 to 27 May 1966.

He was a member of the Parliament of Finland from 1948 to 1966, representing the National Coalition Party.

References

1898 births
1970 deaths
Politicians from Helsinki
People from Uusimaa Province (Grand Duchy of Finland)
National Coalition Party politicians
Ministers of Defence of Finland
Ministers of Trade and Industry of Finland
Members of the Parliament of Finland (1948–51)
Members of the Parliament of Finland (1951–54)
Members of the Parliament of Finland (1954–58)
Members of the Parliament of Finland (1958–62)
Members of the Parliament of Finland (1962–66)
University of Helsinki alumni
Knights Commander of the Order of Merit of the Federal Republic of Germany